Moryntsi is a village (selo) in central Ukraine. It is located in the Zvenyhorodka Raion (district) of the Cherkasy Oblast (province), approximately 35 km from the raion's administrative center, Zvenyhorodka. Moryntsi belongs to Zvenyhorodka urban hromada, one of the hromadas of Ukraine.

The great Ukrainian poet Taras Shevchenko was born in Moryntsi in 1814. The peasant house in which he was born has been restored and functions as a museum of his life.

History
Remains of the Chernyakhov culture have been found in the area of Moryntsi. The first recorded mention of the settlement was in 1648.

References

Sources
  (1972). Історіа міст і сіл Української CCP – Черкаська область (History of Towns and Villages of the Ukrainian SSR – Cherkasy Oblast), Kiev.

External links

 Moryntsi Website
 Hiking the Ukrainian countryside at Welcome to Ukraine Magazine
 Taras Shevchenko's autobiography at the Taras Shevchenko Museum

Taras Shevchenko
Villages in Zvenyhorodka Raion